

A short life sketch (1916-1987) 
He was born on 1 January 1916 in the parish of Thamarakunnu (Chirakkadavu), Kanjirappally and was christened Michael. His parents, Varghese Puthupparampil and Accamma Karipaparambil had an ancestral lineage of illustrious people. Their family history starts from Nilakal (Chayal), one of the seven churches founded by the Apostle, St. Thomas. Nilakal was a flourishing trade-centre where merchants from China, Arabia, Palestine, Rome and Greece used to come to purchase the hill produce, the spices, ivory and sandal. St. Thomas preached the gospel and formed the early Christian Community. After staying for a year, he proceeded to Mylapore where he was martyred in 73AD.

The Puthupparampil family 

The Puthupparampil family had in its lineage Kathanars (Priests) and Aassans (Teachers) who worked much for the growth of the Church. They were the founding fathers of the formal education in the area. Two of the Aassans were also poets and authors. Most of the family members were engaged in the cultivation. When the families expanded, they moved to other places and built chapels or churches there. The Karipaparambil family ventured into agriculture and politics and their major source of income was rubber plantation. About ten from the family were elected members of Legislative Assembly with the notable being Accamma Cherian.

With these noble parental traditions Michael grew up in a vibrant Catholic milieu. His elder brother, Joseph was a teacher in St. Ephrem's English School. His elder sister Veronica joined the sisters of Mary Immaculate in Jabalpur and became the superior of their convent in Nagpur. His younger sister Raechel joined the Carmelites (CSST) and was the Headmistress of their Mt. Carmel High School Kottayam and she merited the National Award for best teachers. Michael had 3 elder sisters other than them.

Michael was very active in the schools he studied and he even started the sodality of our Lady in the School and was its leader. After completing his studies he took up teaching in St. Dominic's School Kanjirappally. He was a good reader of books, the life of St. Francis touched him and in this saintly character he found all his ideals realized. He resigned his job in the school and joined the Capuchins in Quilon (Kollam). Michael had his religious vestition on 2 March 1939 with the new name, John Berchmans. His religious profession was on 3 March 1940 and priestly ordination on 30 March 1946 in Amalashram, Trichy, Tamil Nadu. 
From 1947 to 1951 he was in St. Antony Friary, Kollam. He used to join the Mission Band to preach retreats in the parishes. Being a scholarly reader and practical man, his sermons were alive with thoughts and anecdotes and were much appreciated.

His next scene of ministry was in Bharananganam (1952–1956) where he was sent with a specific mission to start the first Ashram in a Syro-Malabar Rite diocese. He contacted the Bishop, the parish priests and the laity and with their co-operation and support of the Friars, had the Assisi Ashram built. He was appointed and the first Guardian (superior) of the new community. As a guardian, he was a source of inspiration and encouragement to the newly assigned young priests. He was open and eager to listen to their pastoral experiences and offer them positive strokes. He appreciated their individual initiation of the apostolate and once expressed to them his great desire to have a Capuchin Retreat House. When the ecclesiastical Tribunal Court was formed for the Cause of St. Alphorns, he was selected as an official member by the Bishop. His serene approach and ready availability attracted many youths to Ashram Many came to him to get his timely advice or spiritual direction.

From 1956 to 1963, he was the Director of the Capuchin students in Kollam. All of them especially the ones from Maharashtra, Goa, Karnataka and Tamil Nadu States experience Fr. Berchmans as a bond of unity and affection. His former students who occupied key position in the Order speak and write about his availability, his listening virtue, his encouraging appreciation, his never belittling talk and his sense of humour. He was quick to notice and speak about the good qualities of others and ignore the uncharitable criticism about them.

On 13 April 1963, the Indian Capuchins were canonically formed into one Capuchin Province. The Capuchins in India and their superiors in Rome elected Fr. Berchmans, as their best choice to be the First Indian Capuchin Provincial. He moved to shanty Ashram, Coimbatore, Tamil Nadu, the then headquarters. From there, he travelled to the distant parts of India and abroad to visit the friars and guide the affairs of the Order. His service as a Provincial was so successful that the Friars elected him for a second term from 1966. He sent the first missionaries to Andhra Pradesh to implant the Order there. It grew up into the present Capuchin Vice Province with several mission centres including a Major Seminary affiliated to the University in Rome. He met the foreign Capuchin Bishops in North India and made plans to take over gradually their missions. In view of the formation houses and special services, he sent talented friars abroad for higher studies and some were sent to Indonesia, Ethiopia, and Africa as formatters. In his foresight he appointed Vocation promoters in five States. The immediate result was 125 candidates in the next year. The Province was on a steady growth in his term in office.

Considering this rapid growth and expansion of the Province, it was divided in 1972 into 4 autonomous units of administration. Fr. Berchmans remained in Assisi Ashram belonging to the newly named St. Joseph Province. Bishops, priests and religious found him a wise Counsellor.
From 1976 to 1980 he was in the Portiuncula Ashram, Kattappana since the climate of the place was conducive to his health. Here too he was sought after by the clergy and the laity for their spiritual needs. With the help of the friars, he opened a good library and a reading room for the people. His gracious availability helped the participants of the Retreats and Seminars conducted there. Sultan Bathery (1981–1985) was his next field of presence and ministries. The Capuchin candidates trained there found in him a great guide and a noble example. Cyril Mar Basilisk, who became the Archbishop of Trivandrum and the President of CBCI, used to meet him for spiritual guidance. In his words:" Fr. Berchmans's deep faith, spiritual fervour and religious life inspired us all. His devotion to St. Francis and his preferential love for the poor were evident in his life. I used to seek his spiritual advice and holy prayers. His life style did influence me".
In 1985 he joined the community in Assisi Ashram, Bharananganam. In spite of his weak health he helped for the local ministries of confession and counselling. A man of prayer, he spent long time in the chapel. The Doctors of nearby I.H.M. Hospital were treating him for his ailments. Due to his chest pains he was admitted on 12 March 1987 in the Caritas Hospital, Kottayam. He was treated in the I.C.U. for 3 days and was moved to the ward as he was much better. On the 16th morning, his condition worsened. Consciously he received the sacrament of the sick. "Jesus my God, my Redeemer" was his last words as he slept in the Lord at 10:50 A.M. The body was taken to the Assisi Ashram, Bharananganam.

On 17 March 1987, the funeral ceremonies began at 2:30 P.M. The Congregation included a large number of clergy, nuns and laity. Jacob Acharuparambil, Bishop of Trivandrum, a former Capuchin Definitor, spoke during the Holy Mass. He concluded thus "Our dearest Father Berchmans, you were always a friend to us. You were in high positions, yet you remained a humble brother to us all. You faced many painful experiences but you never caused pain to us. Each one of us you believed and trusted each one of us received you unique love. We are now bidding tearful farewell..."
After 8 years, a new Cemetery was built nearer to the Friary Chapel. The remains of the buried in the Old Cemetery were being transferred to the new site. Only few bones remained of the seven deceased friars. The coffin with the body of Fr. Berchmans was found intact. Br. Jovinus and Fr. Gratian who saw and touched the body were amazed at the incorruptible state of their confrere. The same coffin was carried to the new place and interred. Devotees light candles there and claim to be receiving favours through his intercessions.

Assisi Ashram celebrated the Golden Jubilee of its foundation in 2002. On the occasion, a large painted portrait of Fr. Berchmans was installed the Malayalam book titled "Fr. Berchamans the lover of God and Man’ was released. The book describes his life and activities and testimonies from 30 writers who had personal experiences for the saintly Father John Berchmans who was a true lover of God and a humble lover of God's people.

Siblings  
 Annamma Devasia Cheradiyil
 Mariamma Mathai Nellariyil
 Claramma Varkey Payanatt
 PV Joseph
 Sr. Veronica
 Sr. Raechel

References 
 The Capuchin Province of St. Francis of Assisi

External links 
 A Short Life Sketch - Dr. Santhosh
 Fr. Berchmans Cappuchin

1916 births
1987 deaths
Capuchins
Christian clergy from Kerala